Live at Montreux is a live album by The Dubliners released in 1977. It featured Barney McKenna, Luke Kelly, John Sheahan and Jim McCann and was recorded at the Montreux Jazz Festival in 1976 and released on the former German Intercord label. The album was never released on CD, however, single tracks appeared on compilations. In 2016, the album was released on Spotify, Amazon music and other music services as an mp3 download with a new cover.

Track listing
All tracks Traditional; arranged by The Dubliners; except where indicated

Side One
 "Fermoy Lassies and Sporting Paddy"
 "Lark in the Morning"
 "Four Green Fields" (Tommy Makem)
 "Sheahan's Selection - Belfast Hornpipe/Doherty's Reel/Honeymoon Reel/Acrobat/Village Bells/Colonel Rodney"

Side Two
 "The Town I Loved So Well" (Coulter Martin)
 "Kelly, the Boy from Killane"
 "The Mason's Apron"
 "Montreux Monto"

The Dubliners live albums
Albums recorded at the Montreux Jazz Festival
1977 live albums
Intercord albums